The Presidential Traverse is a strenuous and sometimes dangerous trek over the Presidential Range of New Hampshire's White Mountains. To complete the traverse, one must begin at either the northern or southern terminus of the Presidential Range and finish at the opposing end. Beginning the journey at the northern end at Mount Madison, one would pass through the townships of (in order, going in a generally south-southwesterly direction) Low and Burbank's Grant, Thompson and Meserve's Purchase, Sargent's Purchase, Chandler's Purchase, and Bean's Grant (at Mount Pierce), all of which are in Coös County.

Options

The minimum
The basic Presidential Traverse begins from a trailhead on U.S. Route 2 or at the Dolly Copp Campground at the northern end of the Presidentials, crosses the great ridge of the range and ends in Crawford Notch at its southern terminus, or vice versa.

By definition, a "presidential" traverse requires a participant to cross over the summits of peaks named after U.S. presidents. Listed from north to south, they are:

 Mount Madison - named after James Madison 
 Mount Adams - named after John Adams
 Mount Jefferson - named after Thomas Jefferson
 Mount Washington - named after George Washington
 Mount Monroe - named after James Monroe
 Mount Eisenhower - named after Dwight Eisenhower
 Mount Pierce - named after Franklin Pierce

However, you would not summit all peaks.

Additional named peaks

A traverse which collects all of the trail-accessible peaks in the Presidential Range includes (from north to south):

 Mount Clay - named after Henry Clay (a senator from Kentucky and contemporary of Daniel Webster). (In 2003, the New Hampshire legislature passed a law renaming the peak as "Mount Reagan", after President Ronald Reagan, but the U.S. Board on Geographic Names (BGN) voted in May 2010 not to change the name of the mountain.)
 Mount Franklin - named for famed inventor and political figure Benjamin Franklin, a sub-peak of Mt. Monroe.
 Mount Jackson - named not for President Andrew Jackson as many believe, but for Charles Thomas Jackson, who served as State Geologist for New Hampshire, Maine, and Rhode Island in the late 19th century.
 Mount Webster - named for Daniel Webster, famed American statesman and New Hampshire native.

Sub-peaks
Several minor peaks ineligible for the list due to lack of prominence have no maintained trails leading to their summits. Hiking off-trail is prohibited; however, some hikers have bushwhacked them as part of a traverse.  These include:

 Mount Sam Adams - sub-peak of Mt. Adams, named for Samuel Adams (American statesman and second cousin of John Adams)
 Mount JQ Adams - sub-peak of Mt. Adams, named for President John Quincy Adams
 Mount Abigail Adams - sub-peak of Mt. Adams, named for John Adams' wife Abigail Adams (before being renamed in November 2010, this was Adams IV)
 Adams V - an unnamed sub-peak of Mt. Adams

Lodging options 
There are several campsites and huts along the route of the Presidential Traverse. It is recommended that hikers use these sites, as camping above treeline is prohibited. 
 Valley Way Tent Site - Free. First come, first served. This site offers platform-style options for tents. 
 Madison Springs Hut - Expensive. Co-ed bunk accommodations are offered. 
 Lakes of the Clouds Hut - Expensive. Co-ed bunk accommodations are offered. 
 Mizpah Spring Hut - Expensive. Co-ed bunk accommodations are offered.
 Naumann Tent Site - Inexpensive. First come, first served. This site offers platform-style options for tents.

Hazards
The White Mountains and the Presidential Range in particular offer both some of the most beautiful vistas in the Eastern United States and some of its most challenging and dangerous terrain.  Many hikers attempting a Presidential Traverse have become lost or otherwise disabled in inclement weather above treeline, causing many costly search and rescue operations.

Weather

The Presidential Range is perhaps most famous for its tumultuous weather, highlighted by the erratic and often extreme conditions upon Mount Washington and its other summits. Being both at the intersection of several storm tracks and the center of multiple converging valleys funneling wind from the west, southwest, and south make its weather unpredictable and at times violent. The summits of the range have been known to see snow and ice in all seasons, and are subject to a combination of hurricane-force winds and blanketing clouds an average of 110 days a year. Mount Washington long held the record for the highest wind speed ever recorded at the Earth's surface, clocking , forcing summit buildings to be chained down so they won't blow away.

Winter

Views from the Presidentials ridgeline in the crisp winter air are unrivaled in the Northeast. However, winter terrain is more treacherous, temperatures may plummet with dangerous speed, and wind speeds often hit triple digits. Snowfall at elevation is measured in feet instead of inches, avalanches are common on the large snowfields and in ravines, and blowing snow, ice fog, and heavy clouds can cause visibility to disappear in minutes. Consequently, those wishing to tackle a Presidential Traverse in winter must be exceptionally fit, experienced in winter mountaineering and compass orientation techniques, very familiar with the terrain, and have high quality winter gear. Lacking any one of these puts one in serious peril of requiring expensive and hazardous rescue, even death.

Vertical

Moreover, the traverse involves about the same amount of elevation loss as gain.

But in truth, the range is a wind-ravaged wilderness.

References

Sources
 Daniell, G and Smith, S. AMC White Mountain Guide, 27th Edition. AMC Books, 2003.
 Howe, N. Not Without Peril. AMC Books, 2000.
 Cox, S and Fulsaas, K. Mountaineering: The Freedom of the Hills, 7th Edition. The Mountaineers Books, 2003.
 Lanza, M. New England Hiking. Foghorn Press, 1997.

Internet sources
 TrailsNH.com - Current trail conditions for the Presidential Range, compiled daily
 Mount Washington Observatory 
 Hike the Whites 
 Appalachian Mountain Club 
 Chauvin Guides guide to the Winter Presidential Traverse
 Presidential Traverse FAQ's
 AMC White Mountain Guide Online 
 Views from the Top

See also
 Presidential Range
 Mount Washington (New Hampshire)
 Hiking
 Mountaineering
 Peak bagging
 Mount Washington Auto Road
 Mount Washington Cog Railway

White Mountain National Forest
Hiking trails in New Hampshire
Protected areas of Coös County, New Hampshire